The FAM Cup (Malay: Piala FAM) was a knock-out tournament for teams in both the Malaysia M3 League and the Malaysia M4 League in Malaysia. The tournament was a cup format, but from 2008 to 2018 was held as a third-tier league tournament and used the FAM League (Malay: Liga FAM) name. 

The competition was first held in September 1951. Up to 1973, the competition was open to state teams that also competed in the Malaysia Cup, before the Football Association of Malaysia (FAM) opened up the competition to club sides from 1974 onwards.

Format 
 1951–1973: as a secondary knockout competition between state teams only after Piala Malaysia.
 1974–1989: as a secondary knockout competition between club teams only after Piala Malaysia.
 1990–2007: as a third-tier knockout competition.
 2008–2018 : as a third-tier league competition.

History 
Piala FAM was established in August 1951 as a secondary knockout competition to the more prestigious Malaya Cup. The competition was held between the state teams and uniformed units including Singapore, the Police, the Army, and the Malaysian Prison Department in its early days. The inaugural season started in September 1951 after the Malaya Cup final concluded. The final was held on 26 April 1952 between Penang and Selangor which was won by Penang. Starting in 1974, the state teams were barred from entering the competition and only club sides were allowed to enter.

With the advent of the two-division Semi-Pro League in 1989, the FAM Cup became a third-tier competition. In 1993, the format of the competition was changed to include a two-group league which was followed by a traditional knockout format. Promotion to the professional M-League was introduced for the first time in 1997, with Johor FC and NS Chempaka becoming the first two sides to be promoted that year.

The final knockout competition format was played out for the 2007 season where four clubs were promoted including the champions, runners-up and the losing semi-finalists. In 2008, further changes were made when the knockout stages were abolished and a double round-robin league format was introduced. The tournament was now known as Liga FAM.

In 2016, the FAM decided to rename the competition again from Liga FAM back to its original name, the Piala FAM. However, the format of the competition was still contested as a league tournament as before. The final match for the 2016 season was broadcast by Astro Arena. A total of 16 clubs competed in the competition for the 2017 season and was divided into two groups. On 15 February 2017, Sungai Ara withdrew from the league and left the competition with 15 clubs in total.

It was announced on 19 December 2018 that the format was changed back to a straight knock-out tournament, starting from the 2019 season. This proposal was scrapped however as the Football Association of Malaysia rebranded the competition as the Malaysia M3 League from the 2019 season onwards, with the FAM taking control of both the Malaysia M3 League and the Malaysia M4 League as well.

Logo evolution 
Since the inception of the competition in 1951, numerous logos were introduced to reflect the sponsorship. For the 2017 season a new logo was unveiled.

Clubs 
Below are the list of clubs competing in 2018 season.

Champions

As Malaysia FAM Cup

Performances by clubs/teams and states

Performance by club (1952–2018)

Performance by states (1952–2018)

References 

Malaysia FAM League
3
Mal